The pale-striped mulch-slider (Lerista speciosa) is a species of skink found in South Australia.

References

Lerista
Reptiles described in 1990
Taxa named by Glen Milton Storr